Lakewood Shores is a census-designated place (CDP) in Will County, Illinois, United States. The population was 665 at the 2020 census. It is an extension of the neighboring city of Wilmington.

Geography
Lakewood Shores is located at  (41.267397, -88.135792).

Demographics

As of the census of 2000, there were 1,487 people, 517 households, and 402 families living in the CDP. The racial makeup of the CDP was 97.51% White, 0.07% African American, 1.08% Native American, 0.27% Asian, 0.54% from other races, and 0.54% from two or more races. Hispanic or Latino of any race were 2.15% of the population.

There were 517 households, out of which 39.7% had children under the age of 18 living with them, 65.8% were married couples living together, 6.0% had a female householder with no husband present, and 22.1% were non-families. 17.2% of all households were made up of individuals, and 4.4% had someone living alone who was 65 years of age or older. The average household size was 2.88 and the average family size was 3.27.

In the CDP, the population was spread out, with 29.2% under the age of 18, 6.9% from 18 to 24, 32.1% from 25 to 44, 23.6% from 45 to 64, and 8.2% who were 65 years of age or older. The median age was 36 years. For every 100 females, there were 112.7 males. For every 100 females age 18 and over, there were 111.4 males.

The median income for a household in the CDP was $52,097, and the median income for a family was $58,409. Males had a median income of $37,434 versus $26,152 for females. The per capita income for the CDP was $18,414. About 1.9% of families and 2.6% of the population were below the poverty line, including 3.5% of those under age 18 and none of those age 65 or over.

References

Census-designated places in Illinois
Census-designated places in Will County, Illinois